The Chafee–Infante equation is a nonlinear partial differential equation introduced by Nathaniel Chafee and Ettore Infante.

See also
 List of nonlinear partial differential equations

References

Graham W. Griffiths William E.Shiesser Traveling Wave Analysis of Partial Differential p135 Equations Academy Press
 Richard H. Enns George C. McCGuire, Nonlinear Physics Birkhauser,1997
Inna Shingareva, Carlos Lizárraga-Celaya,Solving Nonlinear Partial Differential Equations with Maple Springer.
Eryk Infeld and George Rowlands,Nonlinear Waves,Solitons and Chaos,Cambridge 2000
Saber Elaydi,An Introduction to Difference Equationns, Springer 2000
Dongming Wang, Elimination Practice,Imperial College Press 2004
 David Betounes, Partial Differential Equations for Computational Science: With Maple and Vector Analysis Springer, 1998 
 George Articolo Partial Differential Equations & Boundary Value Problems with Maple V Academic Press 1998 

Nonlinear partial differential equations